Yirrkala fusca is an eel in the family Ophichthidae (worm/snake eels). It was described by Vasily Zuyev in 1793. It is a marine, tropical eel.

References

Ophichthidae
Fish described in 1793